Lindmania longipes is a plant species in the genus Lindmania. This species is endemic to Venezuela.

References

longipes
Flora of Venezuela
Plants described in 1967